Neoregelia pernambucana is a species of flowering plant in the genus Neoregelia. This species is endemic to Brazil.

References

pernambucana
Flora of Brazil
Plants described in 2000